Abdelaziz Souleimani (born 30 April 1958) is a Moroccan football midfielder who played for Morocco in the 1986 FIFA World Cup. He also played for MAS Fez.

References

External links
FIFA profile

1958 births
Moroccan footballers
Morocco international footballers
Association football midfielders
Maghreb de Fès players
Botola players
1986 African Cup of Nations players
1986 FIFA World Cup players
Living people